The Glen Rose Historic District is a national historic district which is located in East Fallowfield Township, Chester County, Pennsylvania. 

It was added to the National Register of Historic Places in 1985.

History and architectural features
This district encompasses seven contributing buildings. They are the James Newlin Tenant House, which was built circa 1840, the George Passmore House, which was erected circa 1810, the Thomas Truman Grist Mill, which was bult sometime around 1775, the James Newlin House, which was erected sometime around 1836, the George Passmore Cobbler Shop, which was built circa 1805, the George Passmore Cider Mill, which was erected circa 1825, and the chapel, which was built sometime around 1920.

This district was added to the National Register of Historic Places in 1985.

References

Historic districts on the National Register of Historic Places in Pennsylvania
Federal architecture in Pennsylvania
Historic districts in Chester County, Pennsylvania
National Register of Historic Places in Chester County, Pennsylvania